Birra Tirana is a beer company based in Tirana, Albania. It is the largest beer producer and the largest selling beer in the country. It is also exported and sold in Kosovo and the United States. The company is fabricated by Birra Malto Brewery. It currently produces three different beer brands. Birra Tirana is sold both in bottles and cans of 0.33 lit and 0.5 lit and also in kegs 30 liters and 50 liters.

July 10, 1960 – Birra Malto is established as Kombinati Ushqimor.
1961 – The company starts operations.
Sept 2, 1998 – Birra Malto is registered as a limited liability company.
2000 – The company is restructured into a joint stock company, wholly owned by the state.
January 2001 – Eleven Albanian investors acquire 94% in Birra Malto for ALL 1.1 bln.
April 2003 - The Albanian Privatisation Agency sells 2.4% in Birra Malto to local company AL & GI Sh.p.k. for ALL 28.4 mln.
July 2005 - The company is awarded an ISO 9001:2000 Quality management systems certificate.
2006 - The company renames to Birra Tirana from Birra Malto.

See also 
 Economy of Albania
 Companies of Albania
 Birra Malto Brewery
 Birra Stela

References
 

Beer brands
Tirana
Drink companies of Albania